Adolfo Luján was a  Cuban baseball pitcher in the Cuban League. He played for eight years  (1882–1891). He played with the Habana club. He was elected to the Cuban Baseball Hall of Fame in 1939.

References

Cuban League players
Habana players
Year of birth missing
Year of death missing
Baseball pitchers